Prince Eboagwu (born 7 June 1986) is a Nigerian footballer who plays for IK Brage in the Swedish Superettan as a central defender or defensive midfielder.

References

External links 
 
 
 Prince Eboagwu at Fotbollstransfers
 Prince Eboagwu at Åtvidaberg official website

1986 births
Living people
Association football midfielders
Allsvenskan players
Superettan players
Doxa Katokopias FC players
IK Brage players
Åtvidabergs FF players
Nigerian footballers
Nigeria under-20 international footballers
Nigerian expatriate footballers
Nigerian expatriate sportspeople in Sweden
Expatriate footballers in Cyprus
Expatriate footballers in Azerbaijan
Expatriate footballers in Malaysia
Expatriate footballers in Sweden
Syrianska IF Kerburan players
FK MKT Araz players